Zada also romanized as zadah, zade, zadeh, zadi, is a Persian suffix used as part of titles or nickname for members of royalty, for example: Beg-zada, Beg-zade, or Beg-zadi. It is also used to form surnames.

Titles built with -zada

Beg
Begzada (Begzade) is a part of Beg, son of Beg.
Begzadi is a part of Beg, daughter of Beg also Beg female use Begum, wife of Baig.

Shah
Shahzada (Shahzade or Shehzade) is a part of Shah, son of Shah.
Shahzadi (Shehzadi) is a part of Shah, daughter of Shah.

Sahib
Sahibzada is a part of Shahib or further male descendant; compare Shahzada.

Khan
Khanzada (Khanzade) is a part of Khan, son of Khan.
Khanzadi is a part of Khan, daughter of Khan also Khan female use Khanum, wife of Khan.

Nawab
Nawabzada is a part of Nawab, son of Nawab.

Surnames built with -zada
 Alizada
 Husaynzada
 Qulizada

See also
Zadeh
Mirza
Pathan
Family name affixes

Notes

Name suffixes
Titles